The following is a list of squads for each national team competing at the 2016 UEFA European Under-17 Championship in Azerbaijan. Each national team had to submit a squad of 18 players born on or after 1 January 1999.

Players in boldface have been capped at full international level at some point in their career.

Group A

Azerbaijan
Head coach: Tabriz Hasanov

Belgium
Head coach: Thierry Siquet

Portugal
In April 2016, Portugal announced 18-man final squad.

Head coach: Hélio Sousa

Scotland
Head coach: Scot Gemmill

Group B

Austria
Head coach: Andreas Heraf

Bosnia and Herzegovina
Head coach: Sakib Malkočević

Germany
Head coach: Meikel Schönweitz

Ukraine
Head coach: Oleksandr Petrakov

Group C

Denmark
Head coach: Jan Michaelsen

England
Head coach:  Steve Cooper

1. Nick Hayes was called up during the tournament due to an injury to Ryan Sandford.

France
Head coach: Bernard Diomède

Sweden
Head coach: Magnus Wikman

Group D

Italy
Head coach: Alessandro Dal Canto

Netherlands
Head coach: Kees van Wonderen

Serbia
Head coach: Ilija Stolica

Spain
Head coach: Santiago Denia

References

External links
Squads on UEFA.com

UEFA European Under-17 Championship squads
2016 UEFA European Under-17 Championship